The First Funeral is an 1878 plaster sculpture by Louis-Ernest Barrias (1841–1905), first exhibited at the Paris Salon that year, where it won a medal of honour. He then produced a marble version for the Salon of 1883. Both works showing Adam and Eve bearing the body of their son Abel. The plaster original is now in the Museum of Fine Arts of Lyon. The marble version is at the Ny Carlsberg Glyptotek in Copenhagen, Denmark.There is also a marble version at the Museo Nacional de Bellas Artes (MNBA) of Argentina. The sizes of this version are: 159 x 99 x 74cm.

Sources
http://www.petitpalais.paris.fr/oeuvre/les-premieres-funerailles

1870s sculptures
Sculptures of the Museum of Fine Arts of Lyon
Plaster sculptures
Sculptures depicting Hebrew Bible people
Cultural depictions of Adam and Eve
Death in art
Cultural depictions of Cain and Abel